Paul Ralph Brecken (1886 in Halifax, Nova Scotia – September 4, 1960 in Calgary, Alberta) was a municipal and provincial level politician and World War I veteran and teacher from Alberta, Canada.

Early life 
Brecken completed high school in 1908 and went on to the University of Toronto in 1909 where he earned a Bachelor of Arts degree in Science. He married Jessie Copeland from Winnipeg, Manitoba in 1910 and they moved to Calgary before the outbreak of World War I, where he became general secretary of the YMCA.

Military career 
Brecken left to fight overseas as an officer for the Canadian Expeditionary Force 4th Brigade in 1914. He returned home after being wounded in action in 1918; he became a longtime member of the Royal Canadian Legion after his military career.

Teaching career 
After Brecken returned home from the war, he went back to school attending Normal School in Edmonton, Alberta, graduating in 1921.

He then became a teacher at Crescent Heights High School in Calgary where he taught from 1921 to 1951. He got involved in city politics near the end of his teaching career, winning a seat as an alderman. During his teaching years, he became a member and later General Secretary of the Kiwanis Capital District, and was also involved with the Canadian Club.

Municipal politics 
Brecken served two stints as an alderman for the City of Calgary. The first was for one year from January 1, 1948, to December 31, 1949. He then served as alderman from January 1, 1952, until his death on  September 4, 1960.  He simultaneously served as a provincial representative from 1952 to 1955.

Provincial politics 
Brecken was elected to the Legislative Assembly of Alberta as a member of the Conservative party in the 1952 Alberta general election and served one term before being defeated in the 1955 Alberta general election.

External links 
 Paul & Jessie Brecken Fonds, Glenbow Museum
 City of Calgary Aldermanic Galley: Page 106
 Kiwanis Capital District History Volume 4

1886 births
1960 deaths
Calgary city councillors
Progressive Conservative Association of Alberta MLAs
Canadian Expeditionary Force officers
YMCA leaders